Sean Feucht is an American Christian singer, songwriter, former worship leader at Bethel Church, and founder of the Let Us Worship movement a series of events which went against public health orders during a pandemic. He ran unsuccessfully as a Republican in California's 3rd Congressional District.

After running for Congress, Feucht hosted large outdoor worship gatherings to protest government restrictions put in place during the COVID-19 pandemic. These events saw thousands of people gather to worship.

Biography 
Feucht was born in Montana and moved to Virginia. He graduated from Oral Roberts University. He became a volunteer worship leader at Bethel Church and joined their record label.

Feucht and 50 other worship leaders visited President Donald Trump for a faith briefing at the White House amid the run-up to the first impeachment of Trump in December 2019. Feucht said of the event, "We just laid our hands on him and prayed for him. It was like a real(sic) intense, hardcore prayer."

Feucht founded Burn 24-7, a prayer and worship movement, in 2005 while attending Oral Roberts University, and Light a Candle in 2010, an international outreach movement which hosts short term mission trips and child sponsorships. He also founded Hold the Line, a movement intended "to inform, educate, and inspire" young people to become politically active and oppose "the progressive agenda being forced upon America."

2020 congressional campaign 
Feucht ran as a Republican for California's 3rd congressional district in 2020, coming in third place with 14% of the votes, finishing behind John Garamendi and Tamika Hamilton in the March 3 primary. Feucht ran a socially conservative campaign, which was against high taxes and staunchly critical of abortion calling it "the slaughter of the unborn and the newborn." Some other issues he wanted to focus on were homelessness and affordable housing in California, and he wanted to give parents more rights regarding mandatory vaccination and sex education.

Political activism

Origins of Let Us Worship concerts 

During the later half of 2020, when the COVID-19 pandemic was ongoing, Feucht arranged worship concerts across the United States that drew crowds of thousands to protest government restrictions on people gathering during COVID-19 lockdowns. These concerts were later expanded to focus on cities with George Floyd protests to respond to BLM protesters. Feucht labeled the movement Let Us Worship. Feucht stated, "We just feel this call to really target cities that are under extreme turmoil and despair and brokenness" and said it was a new Jesus Movement. Bethel Church, where Feucht is a worship leader, did not financially support him, but wrote a statement of support for his movement and vision.

Problems with permits for concerts 
In September 2020, Feucht attempted to hold a Labor Day "prayer rally" at Seattle's Gas Works Park. When the city closed the park, he held the rally in the street across from the park. Feucht originally failed to get a permit, but the city allowed the rally when he called it a "worship protest". Later that month, following a concert in Kenosha, Wisconsin, the site of the Kenosha protests, Feucht was prevented from holding a concert on the South Side of Chicago after police threatened to take action against him for not having a permit for the event.

Concerts in response to racial and political unrest 
In June 2020, Feucht held a worship concert at the site of the murder of George Floyd in Minneapolis, Minnesota, calling it the "Minneapolis miracle" and the "HOPE RALLY." Feucht called Floyd's murder an "injustice" and referred to it as "the trauma" and was critical of Black Lives Matter's support for gender identity politics and abortion in online posts prior to the worship session.

In August 2020, Feucht led worship concerts called "Riots to Revival" in Portland, Oregon, and Seattle, Washington. The sites of the concerts had recently been the sites of major protests and riots, including Seattle's Cal Anderson Park which had been part of the territory controlled by the Capitol Hill Organized Protest. Feucht claimed that between 4,000 and 7,000 attended the concert in Portland.

Claims of political censorship 
Following the June 2020 concert in Minneapolis, Feucht stated on Twitter afterwards that he and senior Bethel pastor Beni Johnson were censored by Twitter and Instagram for sharing videos of the events and posting Bible verses. His posts were shared by Senator Josh Hawley who stated "Cancel culture meets #BigTech. Now @instagram is censoring a Christian worship leader who wants to post videos of praise and worship from places where there has recently been unrest."

Political concerts 
In October 2020, a day before the nomination of Amy Coney Barrett to the Supreme Court, Feucht hosted a Let Us Worship gathering in front of the capitol. The gathering featured around 35,000 thousands people along with special guests such as Meredith Andrews, Senator Josh Hawley, Ricky Skaggs, and Jentezen Franklin.

In September 2021, Feucht held a Let Us Worship memorial service for the September 11 attacks in Washington D.C., with former President Donald Trump giving a prerecorded address. The following day, worshippers walked around the city praying at the White House, the Supreme Court Building, the Lincoln Memorial, and other landmarks.

Feucht has been an active participant in the ReAwaken America tour founded by Clay Clark and sponsored by Charisma News.

Disney protest 
In April 2022, Feucht helped lead a protest against The Walt Disney Company for its opposition to anti-LGBTQ legislation.

Superspreader movie 

Superspreader, a movie based on Feucht's COVID-19 protest concerts, was released on September 29, 2022.

Personal life 
Feucht has a wife: Kate and four children: Keturah, Malachi, Ezra, and Zion.

Discography

Studio albums

Live albums

Extended plays 
 Boundary Lines (2014)
 Let Us Worship – Tulsa (2020)
 Let Us Worship – Seattle (2020)
  Let Us Worship – Los Angeles (2020)
 Let Us Worship – New Jersey (2020)
 Let Us Worship – New York City (2020)
 Let Us Worship – Nashville (2020)
 Boston (2020)

Singles

Bibliography

References

External links 

 

Performers of contemporary worship music
COVID-19 pandemic in California
California Republicans
Oral Roberts University alumni
American Charismatics
Living people
Candidates in the 2020 United States elections
1983 births
21st-century American guitarists
21st-century American male singers
21st-century American singers
People from Redding, California
Guitarists from California
Singers from California